Harold Norris (born November 4, 1931) is a former American football defensive back in the National Football League for the Washington Redskins.  He played college football at the University of California and was drafted in the sixteenth round of the 1955 NFL Draft.

External links
2000 CALIFORNIA GOLDEN BEAR FOOTBALL MEDIA GUIDE

1931 births
Living people
American football defensive backs
California Golden Bears football players
Players of American football from Baton Rouge, Louisiana
Washington Redskins players